Tapashanitidae is an extinct family of cephalopods belonging to the Ammonite subclass in the order Ceratitida.

References
 The Paleobiology Database Accessed on 9/24/07

Xenodiscoidea
Ceratitida families
Permian first appearances
Permian extinctions